The 2000 Speedway Grand Prix of Czech Republic was the first race of the 2000 Speedway Grand Prix season. It took place on 6 May in the Marketa Stadium in Prague, Czech Republic It was the fourth Czech Republic SGP and was won by American rider Billy Hamill.

Starting positions draw 

The Speedway Grand Prix Commission nominated Michal Makovský and Bohumil Brhel as Wild Card.

Heat details

Standings

See also 
 Speedway Grand Prix
 List of Speedway Grand Prix riders

References

External links 
 FIM-live.com
 SpeedwayWorld.tv

C
Speedway Grand Prix
2000